The 2009 NCAA Women's Division I Swimming and Diving Championships were contested at the 28th annual NCAA-sanctioned swim meet to determine the team and individual national champions of Division I women's collegiate swimming and diving in the United States. 

This year's events were hosted by Texas A&M University at the Student Recreation Center Natatorium in College Station, Texas.

California topped the team standings for the first time, finishing 11 points (411.5–400.5) ahead of Georgia. This was the Golden Bears' first women's team title.

Team standings
Note: Top 10 only
(H) = Hosts
(DC) = Defending champions
Full results

See also
List of college swimming and diving teams

References

NCAA Division I Swimming And Diving Championships
NCAA Division I Swimming And Diving Championships
NCAA Division I Women's Swimming and Diving Championships